In mathematics, and in particular representation theory, Frobenius reciprocity is a theorem expressing a duality between the process of restricting and inducting. It can be used to leverage knowledge about representations of a subgroup to find and classify representations of "large" groups that contain them. It is named for Ferdinand Georg Frobenius, the inventor of the representation theory of finite groups.

Statement

Character theory 

The theorem was originally stated in terms of character theory. For any finite group , there is an inner product  on the vector space of class functions  (described in detail in the article Schur orthogonality relations).

.

Let  and  be class functions.

Proof. Every class function can be written as a linear combination of irreducible characters.
We define  for all  Then we have

In the course of this sequence of equations we used only the definition of induction on class functions and the properties of characters. 

Alternative proof. In terms of the group algebra, i.e. by the alternative description of the induced representation, the Frobenius reciprocity is a special case of a general equation for a change of rings:

This equation is by definition equivalent to [how?]

As this bilinear form tallies the bilinear form on the corresponding characters, the theorem follows without calculation.

Module theory 

As explained in the section Representation theory of finite groups#Representations, modules and the convolution algebra, the theory of the representations of a group  over a field  is, in a certain sense, equivalent to the theory of modules over the group algebra []. Therefore, there is a corresponding Frobenius reciprocity theorem for []-modules.

Let  be a group with subgroup , let  be an -module, and let  be a -module. In the language of module theory, the induced module  corresponds to the induced representation , whereas the restriction of scalars  corresponds to the restriction . Accordingly, the statement is as follows: The following sets of module homomorphisms are in bijective correspondence:

.

As noted below in the section on category theory, this result applies to modules over all rings, not just modules over group algebras.

Category theory 

Let  be a group with a subgroup , and let  be defined as above. There is a forgetful functor

This functor acts as the identity on morphisms. There is a functor going in the opposite direction:

These functors form an adjoint pair . In the case of finite groups, they are actually both left- and right-adjoint to one another. This adjunction gives rise to a universal property for the induced representation (for details, see Induced representation#Properties).

In the language of module theory, the corresponding adjunction is an instance of the more general relationship between restriction and extension of scalars.

See also 

 See Restricted representation and Induced representation for definitions of the processes to which this theorem applies.
 See Representation theory of finite groups for a broad overview of the subject of group representations.
 See Selberg trace formula and the Arthur-Selberg trace formula for generalizations to discrete cofinite subgroups of certain locally compact groups.

Notes

References 

 
 
 

Representation theory of finite groups
Theorems in representation theory
Adjoint functors